Sri Lanka competed at the 2012 Summer Paralympics in London, United Kingdom from August 29 to September 9, 2012. Sri Lanka won their first Paralympic medal;  Pradeep Sanjaya won the bronze medal in the men's 400 meter sprint.

Medallists

Athletics 

Men’s Track and Road Events

Men’s Field Events

Women’s Track and Road Events

Wheelchair Tennis

See also

 Sri Lanka at the 2012 Summer Olympics

References

Nations at the 2012 Summer Paralympics
2012
2012 in Sri Lankan sport